In enzymology, an albendazole monooxygenase is an enzyme that catalyzes the chemical reaction

albendazole + NADPH + H+ + O2  albendazole S-oxide + NADP+ + H2O

The four substrates of this enzyme are albendazole, NADPH, H+, and O2, whereas its three products are albendazole S-oxide, NADP+, and H2O.

This enzyme is coded by the gene for CYP3A4 and belongs to the family of oxidoreductases, specifically those acting on paired donors, with O2 as oxidant and incorporation or reduction of oxygen. The oxygen incorporated need not be derived from O2 with NADH or NADPH as one donor, and incorporation of one atom of oxygen into the other donor.  The systematic name of this enzyme class is albendazole,NADPH:oxygen oxidoreductase (sulfoxide-forming). Other names in common use include albendazole oxidase, and albendazole sulfoxidase.  It employs one cofactor, FAD.

References

 

EC 1.14.13
NADPH-dependent enzymes
Flavoproteins
Enzymes of unknown structure